Trinity Christian School may refer to:

 in the United States:
 Trinity Christian School (Arizona), Prescott, Arizona
 Trinity Christian School (Arkansas), Texarkana, Arkansas
Trinity Christian School (Jacksonville, Florida)
Trinity Christian School (Dublin, Georgia)
Trinity Christian School (Sharpsburg, Georgia)
Trinity Christian School (New Jersey), Montville, New Jersey
Trinity Christian School (Pittsburgh), Pittsburgh, Pennsylvania
Trinity Christian School (South Carolina), Rock Hill, South Carolina
Trinity Christian School (Claudville, Virginia)
Trinity Christian School (Fairfax, Virginia)
Trinity Christian School (Morgantown, West Virginia)
Trinity Christian School (Cedar Hill, Texas)
 in other locations:
Trinity Christian School, Canberra, Australia
Trinity Christian School (Calgary, Alberta), Calgary, Alberta, Canada

See also
Trinity Christian High School (disambiguation)
St Regis University (regarding a "Trinity Christian School" diploma mill operation)